The Functional Cargo Block or FGB (from the Russian , , GRAU index 11F77) was part of the Soviet TKS spacecraft. The TKS spacecraft was intended to be used as a resupply craft for Almaz space stations and saw some test flights in the Salyut space station program. The TKS spacecraft was formed by mating a FGB with a VA spacecraft, with both the VA and the FGB being capable of independent operation.

Following the development of the FGB for the TKS spacecraft, the FGB (without VA spacecraft) formed the basis for space station modules in the Soviet and Russian space program – these space station modules are to some extent called Functional Cargo Block (FGB) as well, like the Zarya FGB module.

The FGB provides "functional" support in the form of electrical power, propulsion, guidance and docking; The support for "cargo" operations is supplied in the form of a pressurized habitable cargo storage section (accessible by the crew) and the externally mounted fuel tanks.

History

The Functional Cargo Block (FGB) was originally developed as support for the VA spacecraft – with both together forming the TKS spacecraft, intended for resupply flights to the Almaz space stations. For Salyut space station modules, it was initially intended that the first such modules be derived from the Progress spacecraft (which in turn is a Soyuz spacecraft derivate), and not the FGB. As the Almaz program wound down, TKS test missions to Salyut stations were used to gather experience on docking larger modules to space stations. The TKS flights proved that the FGBs could form the basis of such a space station module, with the TKS being flight ready, and having a considerable larger capacity than the Progress – so the FGB and not the Progress became the basis of many Soviet and Russian space station modules.
The Gamma observatory, the initially intended first Progress-based research module, would become after these and other changes the free-flying Gamma satellite.

Design
The basic layout of the exemplary Zarya FGB consists of two sections: 
 The Instrumentation and Cargo Compartment (ICC) with a pressurized volume of 
 The Pressurized Adapter (PA) with a pressurized volume of 
The PA is separated from the ICC by a spherical bulkhead containing an 800 mm hatch. Both pressurized sections contain working and living areas, in addition to instrumentation separated by interior panels.

Functional Cargo Blocks
FGB based spacecraft include in addition to the original TKS spacecraft:
Salyut 2
Salyut 3
Salyut 5
Polyus spacecraft
Kvant-1 (Mir module)
Kvant-2 (Mir module)
Kristall (Mir module)
Spektr (Mir module)
Priroda (Mir module)
Zarya (ISS module)
Nauka (ISS module)

References

Russian components of the International Space Station